Athens Kallithea Football Club (ΠΑΕ Άθενς Καλλιθέα) is a Greek professional football club based in Kallithea, Athens, Greece, which competes in the Super League 2, the second tier of the Greek football league system.

The club has finished as high as ninth in the Greek top flight (2004–05) and has reached as far as the quarterfinal stage of the Greek Cup on five occasions (1969–70, 1978–79, 1986–87, 2001–02, 2009–10).

History

Founding and Early History
The club was founded on 18 August 1966 from the merger of five local clubs: Esperos, Iraklis, AE Kallitheas, Kallithaikos, and Pyrsos.

In 1970, Kallithea's Grigoris Lambrakis Stadium, named after the Greek liberal politician and peace activist Grigoris Lambrakis, was opened to the public.

Early 2000s in First Division

In 2002, Kallithea achieved promotion to Greece's top division for the first time. The club's first win in the competition was a 3–2 upset of PAOK at Toumba Stadium, thanks to two goals from Theofanis Gekas, on 14 September 2002.

After finishing ninth in 2004–05, Kallithea was relegated from the top division in 2005-06.

Recent History

In the 2021-22 season, Kallithea finished second in Super League 2, seven points back of league winners Levadiakos for promotion to Super League 1, which was the club's most successful season since it last appeared in the top division in 2005–06.

In September 2022, the club rebranded as Athens Kallithea FC. The presentation of the club's rebranding and 22/23 home and away shirts was met with widespread acclaim in Greece and abroad, with Milan-based Rivista Undici calling it "the most beautiful restyling of the year" and London-based Versus calling it "one of the cleanest football rebrands ever."

Stadium
Athens Kallithea FC play at Grigoris Lambrakis Stadium in the Athenian district of Kallithea, located 2 km south of the Acropolis and 1 km west of Andrea Syngrou Avenue, the main road linking the Athens city center to Poseidonos Avenue and the Athens Riviera.

Built in 1970, and named after the Greek liberal politician and peace activist Grigoris Lambrakis, it is a multi-use public stadium with a seating capacity of 6,300.

The stadium is commonly referred to by its nickname “El Paso,” a reference to Clint Eastwood’s 1965 Spaghetti Western film For a Few Dollars More (which had the Greek title Duel in El Paso), as the stadium was built on the site of a quarry and features a tall rock along the north side of the pitch.

Crest and colors

Historical

The first crest of Kallithea consisted of four circles representing the four groups of the merger of 1966, then becoming five circles with the addition of Pyrsos in 1967, which caused an issue with the Hellenic Olympic Committee. As a result, the club introduced a new crest with five stars in a diagonal line. The club's colors were blue and white, which were the colors of the two main groups of the merger, Esperos Kallitheas and Iraklis Kallitheas.

Current

In September 2022, the club rebranded as Athens Kallithea FC and presented a new visual identity. The club's founding year 1966 and traditional five stars representing the founding merger of the club have been maintained as part of the identity, while the new Athens Kallithea FC crest is a stylized AK monogram with five points that reference the five stars. The club's traditional blue and white have been maintained but with an updated blue, and gold has been introduced as a complementary color. The design work was executed by German studio Bureau Borsche, which also handled the rebranding of Inter Milan and Venezia FC.

Players

Men's squad

Out on loan

Honours

Third Division: 3
 1976, 1993, 2010
Fourth Division: 1
 2020

References

External links

Official Website 
Gregoris Lambrakis Stadium 

Association football clubs established in 1966
Football clubs in Attica
1966 establishments in Greece
Kallithea
Super League Greece 2 clubs